Snowbound is the fifth studio album by Fourplay, released in 1999. It is a recording of Christmas songs.

Track listing

Personnel 

Fourplay
 Bob James – acoustic piano, keyboards, arrangements (1, 3-9, 11, 12)
 Larry Carlton – guitars, arrangements (3, 7, 8, 9)
 Nathan East – basses, arrangements (2, 3, 4, 7, 8), vocals (3, 6), finger snaps (4, 9)
 Harvey Mason – drums, arrangements (3, 4, 7, 8, 10), finger snaps (4, 9)

Additional Musicians
 Tim Heintz – synthesizer programming 
 Marcel East – synthesizers (2, 4), additional percussion (2), drums (4), percussion programming (4), arrangements (4), vocal arrangements (4)
 Michael Thompson – additional guitar (3, 4)
 Matt Pierson – finger snaps (4, 9)
 Larry Williams – tenor saxophone (3, 9)
 Steve Holtman – trombone (3, 9)
 Gary Grant – trumpet (3, 9)
 Jerry Hey – trumpet (3, 9), horn arrangements (3, 9)
 Heather Mason – vocals (2)
 Gabriela Anders – vocals (3)
 Eric Benét – lead and backing vocals (4), vocal arrangements (4)
 Kevon Edmonds – backing vocals (4)
 Kevin Weaver-Bay – backing vocals (4)

Reception

References 

Fourplay albums
1999 Christmas albums
Warner Records albums
Christmas albums by American artists
Jazz Christmas albums
Albums produced by Nathan East